Francisco Morazán's first four-year term ended in 1834 and new elections for President of the Federal Republic of Central America were held that year. Morazán become very unpopular among the liberal elites that were his main supporters when he change the federal capital from Guatemala to El Salvador, so this time moderate conservative leader José Cecilio del Valle won the election undisputedly.  Unfortunately, Valle died before taking the oath while traveling between Honduras and Guatemala, so new elections were call for February of the next year.

References 

1834
1834 elections in North America
June 1834 events
1834 in Central America